The Kashia Band of Pomo Indians of the Stewarts Point Rancheria is a federally recognized tribe of Pomo people in Sonoma County, California. They are also known as the Kashaya Pomo.

The reservation, Stewarts Point Rancheria, is located in Stewarts Point in northwest Sonoma County, south of Point Arena. As of 2010, 78 people live on Stewarts Point Rancheria.

Reservation
The Kashia Band's reservation is the Stewarts Point Rancheria. It is located along Skaggs Springs Road in the Stewarts Point community in rural northern Sonoma County. It occupies  in Sonoma County and 78 people live on it. According to the 2010 United States Census 72 of the 78 residents are Native American, and an additional three residents consider themselves to be both Native American and of another race or ethnicity. The reservation has one elementary school, Kashia Elementary School, a community center with a tribal office and medical examination room and two ceremonial Round Houses.

The tribe conducts business from two offices, one in Santa Rosa and the other on the Stewarts Point Rancheria. The nearest outside community is Sea Ranch, which lies to the northwest along the Pacific coast.

History and culture

The Kashaya still live in their ancestral homelands near present-day Fort Ross. Their name for themselves, wina·má· bakʰe yaʔ is alternately translated as "Person who belongs on the land"  or "People From the Top of the Land," or "Kashaya" means "expert gamblers."

When Russians settled in Kashaya lands, they conscripted the tribe to work for them but did not break up the tribe or convert them to Christianity.

Essie Parrish (1902–1979) was an important Kashia Band basket weaver and a spiritual leader of the Kashia Tribe, she strove to sustain Pomo traditions throughout the 20th century. The current spiritual leader of the Kashaya Pomo is Lorin Smith, (born 1935). As a Kashaya Pomo elder and medicine man, Lorin has welcomed non-Indians to visit the round house and take part in the ceremonies.

Demographics
Stewarts Point Rancheria has 78 residents. The reservation is 92.3% Native American, 2.3% white, 1.3% Asian, and 3.8% were two or more races.  14.1% of its residents are Hispanic or Latino (10.3% Mexican, 2.6% Puerto Rican). There are 20 housing units.

Language
The tribe traditionally speaks the Kashaya language, also known as Southwestern Pomo. It belongs to the Pomoan language family of Northern California. Several dozen elders speak the language, and younger people are learning and trying to sustain it.

Restoration of tribal land
The Trust for Public land established the Kashia coastal Reserve, which restored the Kashia Band of Pomo Indians of the Stewarts Point Rancheria access to the Pacific coast after they were forced to an inland reservation approximately 150 years earlier. Archer H Richardson had purchased the property, for $10 in gold coin on October 20, 1925, which features dense redwood forest, towering coastal bluffs, and waterfalls along the Pacific Coast Highway. The Tribe will manage the land as protected open space, and a demonstration forest will be maintained in order to educate and engage the public about the history and practices of indigenous people in the area. Additionally, the Kashia will permit the extension of the California Coastal Trail allowing for public access to their land. Funding for Kashia Coastal Reserve being acquired after five years of fundraising by the Sonoma County government, The Trust for Public Land, private foundations and groups.

Education
The ranchería is served by the Kashia Elementary School District and Point Arena Joint Union High School District.

Notes

References
 Pritzker, Barry M. A Native American Encyclopedia: History, Culture, and Peoples. Oxford: Oxford University Press, 2000. 
 Sarris, Greg.  Keeping Slug Woman Alive: A Holistic Approach to American Indian Texts. Berkeley: University of California Press, 1993. (retrieved through Google Books, 28 July 2009) .

External links
 Kashia Band of Pomo Indians of Stewarts Point Rancheria, tribal website

Pomo tribe
Federally recognized tribes in the United States
Native American tribes in Sonoma County